The State of Vietnam competed as Vietnam in the 1952 Summer Olympics in Helsinki, Finland. It was the first time the nation had participated at the Summer Olympic Games. Eight competitors, all men, took part in seven events in five sports.

Athletics
Men's 10,000 metres
 Trần Văn Lý — 37:33.0 (→ 32nd place)

Boxing
Bantamweight (-54 kg)
 Tiến Vình

Cycling

Road Competition
Men's Individual Road Race (190.4 km)
Quan Luu — 5:24:34.1 (→ 47th place)
Chau Phuoc Vinh — did not finish (→ no ranking)
Nguyen Duc Hien — did not finish (→ no ranking)
Van Phuoc Le — did not finish (→ no ranking)

Fencing

One fencer represented Vietnam in 1952.

Men's épée
 Tôn Thất Hải

Swimming
Men's 100 metre freestyle
 Nguyễn Văn Phan — 1:05.0

References

External links
Official Olympic Reports

Nations at the 1952 Summer Olympics
1952
1952 in Vietnam